West Valley is a hamlet in the Town of Ashford in Cattaraugus County, New York, United States. The population was 518 at the 2010 census, which lists the community as a census-designated place.

Located at the intersection of Cattaraugus County Route 53 and State Route 240/County Route 32, the hamlet is home to West Valley Central School and the West Valley Demonstration Project, a nuclear cleanup facility. Because of the presence of a school district, a telephone exchange (716–942), and a post office located in (and named after) the hamlet, many people mistake West Valley to be the name of an actual town or village. However, it does not have any autonomous government separate from the town of Ashford.

Geography

Demographics

References

External links 
This webliography covers web sites that will inform individuals about the history of the town and businesses and community organizations within. In addition, because of the interrelatedness and the geographical closeness of the communities in this area the webliography contains information about places around the area that would be of interest to people who want to find out more.

Business 
 Department of Energy West Valley Demonstration Project.    
 This is the cleanup effort for a former spent fuel reprocessing plant.

Community group 
 Concerned Citizens. West Valley.
 West Valley Citizen Task Force

Cultural locations 
 Western New York Travel Guide. Museums and Historic Sites in the Chautauqua/Allegheny area.

Education and library 
 West Valley Central School 
 King Memorial Library

Emergency 
 West Valley Volunteer Hose Company

Ethnic 
 Concerned Citizens. Seneca Nation
 Seneca Nation of Indians

Government 
 Southern Tier West Regional Planning and Development Board. Town of Ashford
 Cattaraugus County

History 
 Concord Historical Society. Concord NY Historical Society – History Timeline.
 University at Buffalo Special Collections. Reform, Religion and the Underground Railroad in Western New York.
 USGenWeb-an Ancestry.com Community. Town of Ashford- 1824.
 USGenWeb-an Ancestry.com Community. Welcome to Cattaraugus Towns and County Page.
 USGenWeb-an Ancestry.com Community. “The History of Cattaraugus County, New York.”

Media 
 The Springville Journal
 Olean Times Herald
 The Buffalo News. Communities-Southern Tier.

Recreation 
 The Ashford Hollow Foundation Griffis Sculpture Park. Griffis Sculpture Park: History
 Enchanted Mountains of Cattaraugus County
 Holiday Valley
 Holimont

Regional information 
 Discover Southwest, NY-Southern Tier West Regional Planning and Development Board.
 Ellicottville Chamber of Commerce. Ellicottville, NY.
 New York State Office of Parks, Recreation, and Historic Preservation. Welcome to the Allegany Region.

Religion 
 St. Paul’s United Methodist Church. St. Paul’s United Methodist Church West Valley, NY.
 The Catholic Directory. St. John the Baptist Parish.

Hamlets in New York (state)
Census-designated places in New York (state)
Census-designated places in Cattaraugus County, New York
Hamlets in Cattaraugus County, New York